Máighréad Medbh (born 1959) is an Irish writer and poet.

Life and work
Born in 1959 in Newcastle West, Co Limerick, Medbh now lives in Dublin. She is known as a performative poet and much of her focus has been on live performance since the 1990s, when she was a pioneer in the Irish performance renascence. She has published eight poetry collections and a mixed genre work, as well as three e-novels. She has won awards, including the Single Poem Prize Listowel Writers’ Week 2016, for 'Easter 2016,' and her verse fantasy, Parvit of Agelast, was shortlisted for the Pigott Poetry Prize in 2017. She has been awarded a bursary from the Irish Arts Council, and has had several school residencies.

Bibliography
Imbolg. (Dublin: Arlen House, 2020)
Parvit of Agelast: A Verse Fantasy. (Dublin: Arlen House, 2016)
Pagan to the Core (Dublin, Arlen House, 2014)
Savage Solitude: Reflections of a Reluctant Loner (Dublin: Dedalus Press, 2013)
Twelve Beds for the Dreamer (Dublin, Arlen House, 2010)
When the Air Inhales You (Galway, Arlen House, 2009)
Split in ¡Divas!. (Galway: Arlen House, 2003)
CD: Out of My Skin Dublin: Odin Poetries, 2002
Tenant (The Cliffs of Moher, Salmon Poetry, 1999)
The Making of a Pagan (Belfast, Blackstaff Press, 1990)

E-Books
 The 13th Cone (2014)
 The Coal-black Sea (2013)
 The Body Coat (2013)
Máighréad Medbh: Smashwords Page

Film Collaborations
With artist Bernie Masterson--
 Flight. Winner of the Janet Mullarney Prize 2020
 Bold Writing. Selected for screening by MExIndex 2020
Flight screenings: 
Lacuna Festivals 2021 International, Contemporary Art Festival: Distance (02-07-2021); MESA Magazine online launch (27-03-2021); The Royal Ulster Academy Annual Exhibition (18-10-2020); Contemporary Irish Arts Center Los Angeles, CIACLA  (24-09-2020). 
Flight was winner of the Inaugural Janet Mullarney Prize, curated by Joy Gerrard, Séan Kissane, and Jerome O Drisceoil for the Highlanes Gallery, Drogheda (06-07-2020), and has been acquired by The Highlanes for its permanent collection. 
Bold Writing screenings:  
Mexindex 2020, curated by Richard Ashrowan (18-12-2020); as part of Homeland: ‘On Changing Your Mind’, at: Instituto Cervantes, Dublin (24-11-2019), the LOOP Festival, Barcelona (22-11-2019), and Damer House Gallery, Roscrea (10-08-2019); Glitch Festival, Digital Traces, (17-05-2017); Discover Hidden Gems, MFA Group Show, The Annex, 101 -103 James St, Dublin (06-07-2016).

For Children
 The Rescue, a four-part serialised story for children, set to music by Fergal Carroll, was broadcast on Ireland’s Lyric FM radio station in December 2007 and December 2008.

Translations 
English versions of original poems in Galician and Arabic have been included in the following anthologies:
 Migrant Shores: Irish, Moroccan & Galician Poetry. Edited by Manuela Palacios. Co. Clare: Salmon Poetry, 2017
 Forked Tongues: Galician, Basque and Catalan Women’s Poetry in Translations by Irish Writers. Edited by Manuela Palacios. Bristol: Shearsman Books, 2012 
 To The Winds Our Sails: Irish Writers Translate Galician Poetry. Edited by Mary O’Donnell and Manuela Palacios. Co. Clare: Salmon Poetry, 2010

Anthologies in which work has been published
 Reading the Future: New Writing from Ireland. Dublin: Arlen House, 2018
 Washing Windows? Irish Women Write Poetry. Dublin: Arlen House, 2017
 Stony Thursday Book 2015. Edited by Mary O’Donnell. Limerick Arts Office, 2015
 And Agamemnon Dead: An Anthology of Early Twenty First Century Irish Poetry. Edited by Peter O’Neill & Walter Ruhlmann. Paris: Muavaise Graine, 2015
 Dream of a City: An Anthology of Contemporary Poetry from Limerick City of Culture. 2014. Astrolabe Press, 2014
 The Stony Thursday Book No. 13, Autumn 2014. Edited by Peter Sirr. Limerick Arts Office, 2014
 What We Found There: Poets Respond to the Treasures of the National Museum of Ireland. Edited by Theo Dorgan. Dublin: Dedalus Press, 2013
 The Stony Thursday Book No. 12. Edited by Paddy Bushe. Limerick Arts Office, 2013
 The Blue Max Review. Rebel Poetry, Fermoy International Poetry Festival, 2013
 Shine On. Edited by Pat Boran. Dublin: Dedalus Press, 2011 
 Dogs Singing. Edited by Jessie Lendennie. Co. Clare: Salmon Poetry, 2010
 Salmon: A Journey in Poetry. Edited by Jessie Lendennie. Co. Clare: Salmon Poetry, 2007
 Something Beginning with P. Edited by Seamus Cashman. Dublin: O’Brien Press, 2004
 Forgotten Light. Edited by Louise C. Callaghan. Dublin: A. & A. Farmar, 2003
 The Field Day Anthology of Irish Writing: Volumes IV & V: Irish Women's Writing and Traditions. Edited by Angela Bourke et al. Cork: Cork University Press, 2002
 Short Fuse: The Global Anthology of New Fusion Poetry. Edited by Todd Swift & Philip Norton. New York: Rattapallax Press, 2002
 The White Page / An Bhileog Bhán. Edited by Joan McBreen. Galway: Salmon Publishing, 1999
 An Cloigeann is a Luach / What Worth the Head. Edited by Evelyn Conlon. Limerick: Limerick County Council, 1998
 Nautilus Literarischer Taschenkalender 1996. Edited by Jürgen Schneider, Hamburg: Nautilus, 1996
 Poems in My Earphone. Collected by John Agard. Harlow, Essex: Longman Literature, 1995
 Hearsay: Performance Poems Plus. Compiled by Paul Beasley. London: Bodley Head Children's Books, 1994
 Ireland's Women: Writings Past and Present. Selected by Katie Donovan, A. Norman Jeffares & Brendan Kennelly. Dublin: Gill & MacMillan, 1994
 The Popular Front of Contemporary Poetry. Edited by Paul Beasley. London: Apples & Snakes, 1992
 I Wouldn't Thank you for a Valentine. Edited by Carol Ann Duffy. London: Viking / Penguin 1992
 The Virago Book of Wicked Verse. Edited by Jill Dawson. London: Virago, 1992
 Irrlandt, Ireland, Irland. ed. Jürgen Schneider. Berlin: Druckhaus Galrev, 1992

Prose and Essay
 Monthly Blog on Website 2012-2020
 Prose piece in New Planet Cabaret, ed. Dave Lordan. Dublin: RTE, 2013
 Essay included in Irish Spirit, ed. Patricia Monahan. Dublin: Wolfhound Press, 2001

References

Irish women poets
1959 births
Writers from Limerick (city)
Living people
20th-century Irish poets
21st-century Irish poets
20th-century Irish women writers
21st-century Irish women writers